Alan George Sumner Gibson was Coadjutor Bishop of Cape Town from 1894 to 1906.

Early life
He was born in 1856 to William Gibson (1804–1862), Rector of Fawley, and Louisanna Sumner (1817-1899), daughter of Charles Sumner, Bishop of Winchester. He was educated at Haileybury and Corpus Christi College, Oxford and ordained in 1881.

Clerical career
He was vice-principal of St Paul Burgh Missionary College  then curate of Croft, Lincolnshire.  He was the incumbent of Umtata Pro-Cathedral from 1882 to 1884; Missionary at Dalindyebo from 1884 to 1893; Canon  of Umtata from 1885 to 1894; Archdeacon of Kokstad from 1886 to 1891; 91; Diocesan Secretary from 1892 to 1894; rector of Claremont from 1894 to 1897; and Canon  of St. George's Cathedral, Cape Town from 1895 to 1906.

Works
Gibson was a prolific author; amongst others he wrote: 
Intloko Zentshumayelo (Kaffir Sermon Sketches), 1890;
Eight Years in Kaffraria, 1891; 
Some Thoughts on Missionary Work and Life, 1894; 
Sermon Sketches for a Year, 1898; 
Between Cape Town and Loanda, 1905; 
Translations from the Organon of Aristotle, 1877;
Reminiscences of the Pondomisi War, 1900; and 
Sketches of Church Work and Life in the Diocese of Cape Town, 1901;

Gibson died on 20 October 1922.

References

1856 births
1922 deaths
People educated at Haileybury and Imperial Service College
Alumni of Corpus Christi College, Oxford
Anglican archdeacons in Africa
20th-century Anglican Church of Southern Africa bishops
People from Kokstad
Anglican bishops of Cape Town
19th-century Anglican theologians
20th-century Anglican theologians